Dihydralazine is a prescription drug with antihypertensive properties. It functions by combating the effects of adrenaline, and by expanding the blood vessels so as to enable smoother flow of blood by decreasing the pressure. It is generally administered orally, and is available in the form of tablets. It belongs to the hydrazinophthalazine chemical class. It has very similar effects to hydralazine.

Side Effects 
Headache
Loss of Appetite
Nausea
Vomiting
Diarrhea
Palpitations
Increased Heart Rate
Angina Pectoris

Contraindications 
Contraindications to this drug include allergic reactions to this drug or to any of its components, ischemic heart diseases, coronary artery diseases, valvular stenosis, aortic aneurysms and pericarditis. Patients who have a previous medical history of kidney dysfunctions, liver damage, heart disorders and cerebro-vascular disorders must exercise caution while taking this medicine. Dihydralazine must not be prescribed to patients who are elderly, and to breastfeeding women. Caution must be exercised while prescribing this medicine to pregnant women.

Other Important information on intake 
When ending intake, you are recommended to withdraw gradually from this medicine, as opposed to abruptly ceasing its intake. Heartbeat problems and edema may occur as adverse effects.

See also 
Hydralazine

References

Further reading 
https://go.drugbank.com/drugs/DB12945
https://www.lybrate.com/medicine/dihydralazine

Antihypertensive agents
Hydrazines
Hydrazones
Phthalazines